Abi is a Malay village situated between Kangar and Kaki Bukit in Perlis, Malaysia.

The populations is mostly Malay, Chinese and Siamese.

See also
 Geography of Malaysia

Villages in Perlis
Mukims of Perlis